John Barston (c1545-c1612) was an English writer, law and 'important civic figure'.

Barston was from Tewkesbury. He went to St John's College, Cambridge and the Inns of Court. In 1576, he published his work, The Safeguard of Society, describing the corporate life of Tewkesbury.

References

1545 births
1612 deaths
17th-century English writers
17th-century English male writers
Alumni of St John's College, Cambridge
People from Tewkesbury
16th-century English writers
16th-century male writers
English male writers